Mordellistena palmi is a species of beetle in the genus Mordellistena of the family Mordellidae. It was described by Liljeblad in 1945.

References

Beetles described in 1945
palmi